General Ayres may refer to:

Leonard Porter Ayres (1879–1946), U.S. Army brigadier general
Raymond P. Ayres (born 1944),  U.S. Marine Corps lieutenant general
Romeyn B. Ayres (1825–1888), Union Army brigadier general and brevet major general
Thomas E. Ayres (born 1962), U.S. Army major general